The Flame of Life (also known as That Lass o' Lowrie's) is a 1923 American silent drama film starring Priscilla Dean, Robert Ellis, Kathryn McGuire, and Wallace Beery. The film was written by Elliott J. Clawson from the Frances Hodgson Burnett novel That Lass o' Lowrie's and directed by Hobart Henley.

A print of The Flame of Life is currently housed in the NBCUniversal Syndication Studios archives, but is available for the company's internal research and referencing purposes only and is not available to the general public.

Plot
As described in a film magazine, Joan Lowrie (Dean) is one of the beasts of burden making up the population of the little English mining village. Culling slate from coal all day long with a score of broken-down hags, young women, and girls, she lived a life of horror at home, beaten constantly by her father. The mine receives a new over-man, Fergus Derrick (Ellis), trying to get on friendly terms with the drudging slaves, but meets a spirit of independence that proved the people better than animals. Fergus advocated for better working conditions, but the mine owners laughed at him. Dan Lowrie (Beery) was caught smoking in a shaft by the over-man and was fired. Dan threatened murder and when attempting it the over-man was saved by Joan. The young superintendent then learns in various ways of her hidden nobleness of character and also of her father's cruelty. In time the young woman and the over-man break down the wall of class between them. Assisting in her education, seeing her prove her worthiness by her actions during a mine disaster, Fergus falls deeply in love with her and their happiness came with ceaseless efforts.

Cast

Production
The Flame of Life is one of the films which has had several internal production conflicts which resulted in constant changes in decisions with the basic information related to the film. One such example is the constant change of its name. The film was marketed all across the United States with the name The Lass o' Lowrie's after the name of the novel the storyline was adapted from in 1922. However, in January 1923, just a few days before its release, the company decided to go ahead with The Flame of Life.

Another interesting fact dates back to 1916. On November 21, 1921, the Motion Picture News revealed that the playwright Elliott Clawson was working on rewriting the script of the Bluebird Photoplays feature Secret Love (1916), which was also based on the novel That Lass o' Lowrie's, thus revealing to the audience a bit of what they might expect but the release was rather received with surprise since the storyline was actually adapted directly from the novel but in a completely different way than how Secret Love was written with the highlights being major changes in the overall setting and a major change in genre.

References

External links

Still at gettyimages.com

1923 films
1920s English-language films
American silent feature films
Films based on works by Frances Hodgson Burnett
Films directed by Hobart Henley
Lost American films
Universal Pictures films
American black-and-white films
Silent American drama films
1923 drama films
1923 lost films
Lost drama films
1920s American films